The 1991 LPGA Tour was the 42nd season since the LPGA Tour officially began in 1950. The season ran from January 18 to November 10. The season consisted of 34 official money events. Pat Bradley and Meg Mallon won the most tournaments, four each. Bradley led the money list with earnings of $763,118.

The season saw the first tournament in Australia, the Daikyo World Championship. There were five first-time winners in 1991: Danielle Ammaccapane, Michelle Estill, Meg Mallon, Melissa McNamara, and Nancy Scranton.

The tournament results and award winners are listed below.

Tournament results
The following table shows all the official money events for the 1991 season. "Date" is the ending date of the tournament. The numbers in parentheses after the winners' names are the number of wins they had on the tour up to and including that event. Majors are shown in bold.

Awards

References

External links
LPGA Tour official site
1991 season coverage at golfobserver.com

LPGA Tour seasons
LPGA Tour